Qaduneh-ye Oiya (also Romanized as Qādūneh-ye ‘Olyā; also known as Qūdāneh-ye Bālā and Qūlāneh-ye Bālā) is a village in Zavkuh Rural District, Pishkamar District, Kalaleh County, Golestan Province, Iran. At the 2006 census, its population was 751, in 142 families.

References 

Populated places in Kalaleh County